The March 2010 United Kingdom Budget, official known as Budget 2010: Securing the recovery, was delivered by Alistair Darling, Chancellor of the Exchequer, to the House of Commons on 24 March 2010.

The budget speech outlined the Labour Government's fiscal policies prior to the expected 2010 general election, which had to be called before July.

The Budget's main headlines included:

A one-off "bank payroll tax" on bankers bonus payments, projected to be worth £2bn
£11bn of savings across Government and a further £5bn savings from targeted spending
Introduce a new right to open a basic bank account
Above-inflation increases to alcohol and tobacco duties, with a pledge to redefine strong ciders in September 2010
To reduce a previously announced fuel duty increase in April 2010, and introduce small increases at intervals
Temporary increase in small business rate relief
Threshold for stamp duty raised from £125,000 to £250,000 for first-time buyers for two years, and increased stamp duty on homes over £1,000,000 to 5%
Pledge of an increase in future ISA savings limits to keep pace with inflation, and confirmed previously announced increase in ISA savings limits
Introduction of a Tax break for the British video games sector

The Chancellor aimed for public sector net borrowing to fall to 8.5% of GDP by 2011-12, and 4.0% by 2014-15.
Public sector net debt was projected to increase to 73% of GDP by 2012-13.

The Treasury published the Finance Act 2010 on 1 April, running to 240 pages.
After the General Election was called on 6 April, the Chartered Institute of Taxation expressed concern at the lack of time for debate on complex measures.
In the event, many of the clauses announced in the Budget speech were dropped from the Bill before Parliament was dissolved.

Taxes

Spending

References

External links

 Budget 2010 (Overview), HM Treasury document at The National Archives
 Budget 2010: Securing the recovery, HM Treasury page at The National Archives

Budget
2010-03
United Kingdom,03
United Kingdom budget